Isbanir Fossa is a north-south trending scarp on Saturn's moon Enceladus.  Isbanir Fossa was first seen in Voyager 2 images, though a small section was seen at much higher resolution by Cassini.  It is centred at 12.6° North Latitude, 354.0° West Longitude and is approximately 132 kilometres long.  Based on photoclinometric analysis of Voyager 2 images (using topographic shading in an image to determine slope), like the one at right, Isbanir Fossa was determined to be a 300-metre tall, west-dipping scarp (Kargel and Pozio 1996).  Two sets of troughs can be seen running perpendicular to Isbanir Fossa, like Daryabar Fossa.  These troughs appear to be right-laterally offset 15–20 km east and west of Isbanir Fossa, suggesting that the scarp may be a strike-slip fault or even a transform fault with troughs like Daryabar Fossa representing spreading centres (Rothery 1999).

Isbanir Fossa is named after the home of Fakir Taj from Arabian Nights.

References

Surface features of Enceladus
Escarpments